Frank Gamble may refer to:
 Frank Gamble (footballer, born 1871) (1871–?), English footballer for Sheffield United
 Frank Gamble (footballer, born 1961), English footballer for Derby County and Rochdale

See also
 Frank Gambale, Australian jazz fusion guitarist